Brevoort or Brevort may refer to:

Places
 Bredevoort (in Low Saxon: Brevoort), Aalten, Netherlands
 Brevoort Houses, Brooklyn, New York City
 Brevoort Island, Nunavut, Canada
 Brevoort Park, Saskatoon, Saskatchewan, Canada

Michigan
 Brevoort Lake
 Brevoort River
 Brevort, Michigan
 Brevort Township, Michigan
 Little Brevoort River

People
 J. Carson Brevoort (1818–1887), American collector of rare books and coins
 James Renwick Brevoort (1832–1918), American landscape painter
 Meta Brevoort (1825–1876), American mountain climber
 Tom Brevoort, American comic book editor
 Augustus Brevoort Woodward, (1774–1827), first Chief Justice of the Michigan Territory
 Christian Brevoort Zabriskie (1864–1936), American businessman